Downtown Richwood Historic District is a national historic district located at Richwood, Nicholas County, West Virginia.  The district includes 51 contributing buildings in the central business district of Richwood. They consist of mostly two and three-story masonry commercial buildings from the late 19th and early 20th century.  They have storefronts on the first floor and house on the upper floors.  Notable buildings include the U.S. Post Office (1936), First Methodist Church (1922) designed by Levi J. Dean, Richwood Banking and Trust Building (1902), and New Star Theatre, also by Levi J. Dean.

It was listed on the National Register of Historic Places in 2001.

References

Historic districts in Nicholas County, West Virginia
Historic districts on the National Register of Historic Places in West Virginia
Italianate architecture in West Virginia
Romanesque Revival architecture in West Virginia
Buildings and structures in Nicholas County, West Virginia
National Register of Historic Places in Nicholas County, West Virginia